Michel Vaillancourt (born July 26, 1954) is a Canadian show jumper who won an individual silver medal at the 1976 Olympics. He tied for second place with Debbie Johnsey and François Mathy, but won the silver in a jump-off. Vaillancourt finished in fifth place with the Canadian team.

Vaillancourt started training in horse riding aged 12, encouraged by his father, an equestrian coach who died in a horse riding accident in 1971. At his first international competition, Vaillancourt won a team bronze medal at the 1975 Pan American Games. He won a silver team medal at the next Games in 1979. Vaillancourt missed the 1980 Olympics in Moscow that were boycotted by Canada, and competed at the Alternate Olympics, winning a team gold medal. After retiring from competitions he worked as a course designer and coach, supervising the Canadian equestrian team at the 1994 and 1998 Olympics. He was inducted into the Jump Canada Hall of Fame in 2009.

References

1954 births
Canadian male equestrians
Equestrians at the 1976 Summer Olympics
Living people
Olympic equestrians of Canada
Olympic silver medalists for Canada
Sportspeople from Quebec
Canadian show jumping riders
Olympic medalists in equestrian
Medalists at the 1976 Summer Olympics
Pan American Games silver medalists for Canada
Pan American Games bronze medalists for Canada
Pan American Games medalists in equestrian
Equestrians at the 1975 Pan American Games
Equestrians at the 1979 Pan American Games
Medalists at the 1975 Pan American Games
Medalists at the 1979 Pan American Games
20th-century Canadian people
21st-century Canadian people